Hyposmocoma praefracta is a species of moth of the family Cosmopterigidae. It was first described by Edward Meyrick in 1935. It is endemic to the Hawaiian island of Kauai. Its type locality is Kumuwela.

External links

praefracta
Endemic moths of Hawaii
Moths described in 1935